Zoltfab Eseanu is a Romanian sprint canoer who competed in the mid-1970s. He won a silver medal in the K-1 4 x 500 m event at the 1975 ICF Canoe Sprint World Championships in Belgrade.

References

Living people
Romanian male canoeists
Year of birth missing (living people)
ICF Canoe Sprint World Championships medalists in kayak